Torkaman ( Torkaman, English: Turkmen)  is a 1974 Iranian Persian-genre romance film directed by Amir Shervan and starring Naser Malek Motiee, Iraj Ghaderi, Azam Mirhosseini, Abolfazl Mirzaei, Nariman Shirifard, Rafi Madadkar and Majid Mozafari.

References

External links

1974 films
1970s thriller drama films
Iranian drama films
Iranian black-and-white films
1970s Persian-language films